"I Wonder If Heaven Got a Ghetto" is a song by American rapper 2Pac. It was released as the first single from the posthumous album R U Still Down? (Remember Me). The original version, titled "I Wonda if Heaven's Got a Ghetto", was released as a B-side on the 1993 single, "Keep Ya Head Up".

There are two versions of the song on the R U Still Down? (Remember Me) album. One, a remake of the original (using the same sample); the other, a completely new remix, subtitled as the "hip hop version", was the version used for the song's single release.

The song's title originally came from the lyrics of fellow West Coast rapper,  Spice 1's 1992 song, "Welcome to the Ghetto", and contains a direct sample of Cameo's 1978 song, Two of Us.

Rapper Nas interpolated "I Wonder if Heaven Got a Ghetto" in the song "Black President" from his untitled 2008 album. The line "And though it seems heaven sent/We ain't ready to have a black president" is used repeatedly as the song's chorus. Rapper The Game used the instrumental in the beginning of his song "I Didn't Wanna Write This Song" off of his last studio album Born 2 Rap.

Music video
In the Lionel C. Martin directed music video from September 14–15, 1997, the perspective is a first-person viewpoint of Shakur. After being shot, he stumbles to a nunnery in fictional Rukahs, New Mexico. ('Rukahs' spelled backward is 'Shakur'.) The license plate of the car that Shakur gets in with the older man reads "61671", which references Shakur's birthday on June 16, 1971. The room he goes into with the girl is room number 7. The clock in the background at the end is set to 4:03, the same time Shakur officially died at 4:03, Tupac appears also. At the end, he goes into Amaru Diner, Amaru being his middle name.

In the first 5 seconds "...rapper Tupac Shakur shot multiple times" is heard from the helicopter.

The video also features several notable figures. Mother Teresa is seen getting on a bus, and already on the bus are Jimi Hendrix, Martin Luther King Jr., Huey P. Newton, and Elvis Presley.

Charts

Weekly charts

Year-end charts

References

External links

1997 singles
Tupac Shakur songs
1997 songs
Songs released posthumously
Song recordings produced by Soulshock and Karlin
Songs written by Roger Troutman
Songs written by Larry Troutman
Songs written by Tupac Shakur